Chehalem Airpark ,  is a public airport located 4 miles (6.4 km) northwest of Newberg, in Yamhill County, Oregon, USA.

External links
Precision Aviation

Airports in Yamhill County, Oregon